= Dramaturgische Gesellschaft =

Association of performing arts people

The Dramaturgische Gesellschaft is an association of performing arts workers and students from Germany, Austria, and Switzerland. Its headquarters is in Berlin.
